The Regina Red Sox are a collegiate summer baseball team based in Regina, Saskatchewan, Canada. They play in the Western Canadian Baseball League. The Red Sox have won the WMBL title twice, once in 2011 and once in 2012. The Red Sox also won the SMBL (Saskatchewan Major Baseball League) championship in 1976 and 1977, and the SBL (Southern Baseball League) in 1942, 1953, 1955, 1960, 1964, and 1969.

The team plays at Currie Field in Regina.  In 2021, the Red Sox announced concept plans for a new 3,500 seat baseball park.

References

Baseball teams in Saskatchewan
Sport in Regina, Saskatchewan